A self-loading rifle or autoloading rifle is a rifle with an action using a portion of the energy of each cartridge fired to load another cartridge. Self-loading pistols are similar, but intended to be held and fired by a single hand, while rifles are designed to be held with both hands and fired from the shoulder.

Evolution
Early breech-loading firearms were single-shot devices holding a single cartridge. When that cartridge had been fired, the person using the firearm would remove the empty cartridge, find another cartridge from a pocket or other carrying apparatus, and load that cartridge into the firearm chamber before another shot could be fired. Later repeating rifles and pistols were equipped with a magazine holding several cartridges with a spring to push those cartridges into position to be loaded by manually operating the action of the firearm, and avoiding the procedure of locating and manually positioning each new cartridge. Later self-loading firearms avoid manual operation of the action by using energy of the cartridge being fired to operate the action, so the shooter may fire additional cartridges without manually operating the firearm action until the magazine is empty.

Variations
Self-loading rifles include:
 Semi-automatic rifle, a type of firearm which fires a single shot with the pull of a trigger, and uses the energy of that shot to chamber the next round. Examples:
 Remington Model 8
 Winchester Model 1907
 Automatic rifle, a firearm that automatically loads and fires rounds, through the bullet's energy, as long as its trigger is held down. Examples:
 Lewis gun
 Bren light machine gun
 Selective-fire rifle, e.g. assault rifle, that is capable of switching between semi-automatic, fully automatic and/or burst fire mode of operation including:
 M16 rifle
 AK-47

Sources

Rifles

ru:Самозарядная винтовка